Megan Mitton is a Canadian politician, who was elected to the Legislative Assembly of New Brunswick in the 2018 election. She represents the electoral district of Memramcook-Tantramar as a member of the Green Party.

She was previously a Green Party candidate in the same district in the 2014 election, finishing third behind Bernard LeBlanc and incumbent Mike Olscamp. She was re-elected in the 2020 provincial election.

Mitton grew up in Sackville, NB and graduated from Tantramar Regional High School. She earned her Bachelor of Arts at McGill University in Montreal, QC, where she studied international development, political science and women’s studies.

In 2016, Mitton was elected to serve as a Sackville Town Councillor. She served on the committees for Tourism and Business Development, Corporate Affairs and Strategic Development, the Sackville Arts Wall, Public Safety, and Policy and By-law.

Mitton was first elected to the Legislative Assembly of New Brunswick on September 24, 2018. She became the first Green MLA to be elected in her riding, the first woman elected as a Green MLA in New Brunswick history, and one of the first 10 Green parliamentarians elected in Canada.

Mitton was re-elected to the 60th Legislature on September 14, 2020. Mitton is a member of the Standing Committees on Public Accounts, Climate Change and Environmental Stewardship, Private Bills, and Social Policy. She is also the Green Caucus Advocate on matters of Healthy and Inclusive Communities, Climate Justice, and Education.

Electoral record

|-

|-

|-

References

External links
Megan Mitton on Facebook

Living people
Green Party of New Brunswick MLAs
People from Moncton
Women MLAs in New Brunswick
21st-century Canadian politicians
21st-century Canadian women politicians
1986 births